The Northern Buckeye Conference (NBC) is an OHSAA high school athletic conference that began athletic competition in 2011 with 8 high schools from Northwest Ohio's Ottawa and Wood counties as members.

Members

Future members

History

2010s
The NBC officially formed on July 1, 2011, and began its inaugural season in the fall of 2011.  The idea for the league was born in the spring of 2009 when the Suburban Lakes League was unable to gather enough votes amongst member schools to make former Northern Lakes League member Rossford its eighth member as a replacement for Lakota.  The SLL principals created a plan for a 12-team, 2-division league upon the request of Eastwood's superintendent, and voted 6-0-1 to begin contacting schools to invite them into this league.  Shortly after, the idea for expansion was dropped when the seven members could not agree on which schools to approve extending membership to.  Speculation on proposed members was pointed at Rossford, Fostoria, Maumee, Northwood, Ottawa Hills, Cardinal Stritch, and Danbury.

Ultimately, the five SLL schools that "voted" for Rossford's inclusion held a superintendent's meeting without Gibsonburg and Elmwood to discuss creating a new league.  In this meeting, Eastwood, Genoa, Lake, Otsego and Woodmore decide to withdraw from the Suburban Lakes League in order to create a new league with Rossford called the Northern Buckeye Conference.  Former NLL commissioner and Northview High School athletic director Larry Jones was named league commissioner, which became effective on August 1, 2009.  Plans to add two more schools to the league became a priority shortly after.  Elmwood, Fostoria, and Maumee confirmed receiving verbal invitations to apply for NBC membership, and on August 5, 2009, Commissioner Jones announced that only Elmwood and Fostoria had formally applied prior to the July 31 deadline.  Maumee's school board voted on August 3, 2009, to remain in the NLL.  The NBC voted to invite both Elmwood and Fostoria on August 12, to which Fostoria quickly accepted on August 17 and Elmwood on September 9, after they were denied admission into the Midland Athletic League.

Since the league has Northern Lakes League commissioner Larry Morrison as a consultant, and five of the schools had prior membership with the NLL, the NBC set up their league bylaws and constitution similar to the NLL's.  This also includes a "majority rules" clause for votes, which is different from the SLL's that called for a 75% vote.

Commissioner Jones stepped down at the end of May 2013 and handed the reigns over to Dave Bringman.

2020s

In August 2020, Elmwood announced they had received a formal invitation from the Blanchard Valley Conference and was seriously looking at the opportunity. However, no immediate plans were announced to leave the Northern Buckeye Conference.  Ultimately, on February 8, 2021, multiple sources confirmed the Elmwood Local Schools board unanimously approved that the Elmwood Royals would leave the NBC and join the Blanchard Valley Conference in the 2023-2024 school year or sooner.

On March 22, 2021, the school board at Maumee voted unanimously to leave the NLL and join the Northern Buckeye Conference no later than the 2023-24 school year as a replacement for Elmwood, following their departure to Blanchard Valley Conference.

On May 20, 2021, Woodmore's school board announced they were going to accept the Sandusky Bay Conference's invitation to join their league for the 2023-24 school year.  It is speculated that Woodmore will leave the NBC to play in the SBC's River Division with schools of similar enrollment size.

On May 26, 2021, the school board at Oak Harbor announced they would be leaving the SBC and accepting the NBC's invitation to replace Woodmore.

League championships

Boys championships

Girls championships

Individual State Champions
Erik Fertig, Eastwood, Discus, 2019
Katelyn Meyer, Eastwood, High Jump, 2018
Erik Fertig, Eastwood, Discus, 2018
Regan Clay, Rossford, 400m, 2016
Regan Clay, Rossford, 400m, 2015 
Cole Gorski, Otsego, Pole Vault, 2014
Jay Nino, Genoa, Wrestling (220 lb.), 2014

See also
Ohio High School Athletic Conferences

References

External links
Northern Buckeye Conference Official Site
5 from SLL join Rossford for new league
Five SLL schools, Rossford plan new league
Napoleon replaces Rossford in NLL
Fostoria applies to join new league
2 schools apply to join NBC
NBC gives invitation to Fostoria, Elmwood
Fostoria votes to join NBC
Elmwood to join Northern Buckeye Conference
Realignment makes waves; 4 area conferences to have different looks.  Toledo Blade, 27 Dec 2009

Ohio high school sports conferences